Glyptus is a genus of beetles in the family Carabidae, containing the following species:

 Glyptus insignia Gestro, 1895
 Glyptus sculptilis Brulle, 1835

References

Orthogoniinae